Anatone is an unincorporated community in the northwest United States, located in Asotin County, Washington. Because it is not tracked by the U.S. Census, a Census population estimate is not available. However the citizens of Anatone perform a population census themselves and update the sign (pictured below) every summer. Anatone is assigned the ZIP code 99401.

Anatone was first settled in 1878 by Daniel McIvor and Charles Isecke. It was named for a Nez Perce woman. It is a working class agricultural area, near the tripoint with Idaho and Oregon. The primary crop grown in the area is wheat, and no services are available.

As of 2000, an estimated 221 people lived in areas served by the Anatone Post Office, in 167 housing units.
As of January 1, 2010, there are 38 people in the town of Anatone.

Images

Climate
According to the Köppen Climate Classification system, Anatone has a Humid continental climate, abbreviated "Dsb" on climate maps.

Notable People

Aaron Shearer, classical guitarist

References

External links

Unincorporated communities in Asotin County, Washington
Unincorporated communities in Washington (state)
Lewiston–Clarkston metropolitan area